Natalya Dmitrievna "Natasha" Stefanenko (born 18 April 1969) is a Russian and Italian actress, model, and television presenter who lives and works in both Italy and Russia.

Early years 
Stefanenko was born in Yekaterinburg (then Sverdlovsk), the daughter of a nuclear engineer who worked in a secret unnamed city underground, close to the Ural Mountains. She lived with her family in a closed city and they also owned a dacha beside a lake.

Stefanenko was also a swimming champion who swam with Alexander Popov; when she was a young girl she swam 10 kilometres a day.<ref>Corriere della Sera</ref> In 1984, she almost joined the Soviet Olympic swim team, but preferred to continue with her education. As it turned out, the Soviet Union decided to boycott the 1984 Summer Olympics which were held in Los Angeles.

At the age of 16, Stefanenko went to study in Moscow where she eventually earned a degree in Metal Engineering.

 Career 
After winning the Look of the Year contest in Moscow in 1991, Stefanenko moved to Milan, where she obtained work as a model. After being discovered in a restaurant by director Beppe Recchia, she made her first television appearance on the variety show, La grande sfida, alongside host Gerry Scotti, without being able, at the time, to speak the Italian language.

She commenced her acting career with the cinematographic film La grande prugna in 1999.
She played the character Angela Cornelio,  one of the protagonists in the television series Nebbie e delitti (Fog and Crimes), which aired on Rai Due from 2005 to 2009. She has also hosted many programmes, including the 2001 edition of  Festivalbar, which is an annual series of televised summer concerts performed by both Italian and international pop groups in town squares throughout Italy; and Italia's Next Top Model in 2009. In the same year 2009, she had a role in Mediaset Canale 5's police drama series, Distretto di Polizia 9 (Police District 9).
Since 2007, she is also a host of Russia's TV show "Snimite eto nemedlenno" which is based on the British programme What Not to Wear (UK).

 Personal life 
In December 1995, Stefanenko married Italian entrepreneur and ex-model Luca Sabbioni, and they have one daughter, Sasha, who was born in 2000.

Filmography
Films

Television

 Television 
(A partial list)
 La grande sfida (1992),  variety show
 Per tutta la vita (1997), matrimonial show
 Gioco di specchio (2000), television film
 Nebbie e delitti (2005–2009), television series
 Festivalbar (2001), televised summer concerts; co-presenter
 Italia's Next Top Model (2007–2011), reality show; presenter, judge
 Снимите Это Немедленно (Russia, 2007–present), presenter
 Camera Cafe (2007), sit-com
 Quelli che....il calcio (2007)
 Distretto di Polizia 9 (2009), television series
 7 vite 2 (2009), sit-com
 Съешьте это немедленно'' (Russia, 2011–present), presenter
 Топ-модель по-русски: Международный сезон (2014), reality show; presenter, judge

References 

 Natasha Stefanenko at the Internet Movie Database
 Italian Wikipedia

1971 births
Living people
Actors from Yekaterinburg
Russian actresses
Russian female models
Russian television presenters
Expatriate actresses in Italy
Russian women television presenters
Mass media people from Yekaterinburg